Trombidium kneissli is a species of mite in the genus Trombidium in the family Trombidiidae. It is found in Europe.

Name
The species is named in honor of the priest Ludwig Kneißl, whose mite collection can be found in Zoologische Staatssammlung München.

References
 Synopsis of the described Arachnida of the World: Trombidiidae

Trombidiidae
Animals described in 1915
Arachnids of Europe